Kitwe District is a district of Zambia, located in Copperbelt Province. The capital is Kitwe. As of the 2000 Zambian Census, the district had a population of 376,124 people.

Constituencies 
Kitwe District is divided into five constituencies, namely Nkana, Wusakile, Kamfinsa, Chimwemwe and Kwacha.

References

Districts of Copperbelt Province